Alishan Sharafu (born 10 January 2003) is an Indian-born cricketer who plays for the United Arab Emirates national cricket team. He was named in the United Arab Emirates squad for the 2020 Under-19 Cricket World Cup. In their plate semi-final match against Nigeria, Sharafu scored an unbeaten 59 runs and was named the man of the match. He made his Twenty20 International (T20I) debut for the United Arab Emirates on 23 February 2020, against Iran, in the 2020 ACC Western Region T20 tournament.

In December 2020, he was one of ten cricketers to be awarded with a year-long part-time contract by the Emirates Cricket Board. In January 2021, he was named in the UAE's One Day International (ODI) squad to play against Ireland. He made his ODI debut for the UAE, against Ireland, on 8 January 2021. However, the following day he tested positive for COVID-19, resulting in the next ODI match being rescheduled.

In January 2022, he was named as the captain of the UAE's team for the 2022 ICC Under-19 Cricket World Cup in the West Indies.

References

External links
 

2003 births
Living people
Emirati cricketers
United Arab Emirates One Day International cricketers
United Arab Emirates Twenty20 International cricketers
Cricketers from Kerala
Indian emigrants to the United Arab Emirates
Indian expatriate sportspeople in the United Arab Emirates